Kanik (also Romanized as Kānīk and Kanek; also known as Kahanak) is a village in Momenabad Rural District, in the Central District of Sarbisheh County, South Khorasan Province, Iran. At the 2006 census, its population was 35, in 10 families.

References 

Populated places in Sarbisheh County